is a Prefectural Natural Park in Yamagata Prefecture, Japan. Established in 1967, the park lies wholly within the municipality of Tendō. The park's central feature is the eponymous Tendō plateau.

See also
 National Parks of Japan

References

Parks and gardens in Yamagata Prefecture
Tendō, Yamagata
Protected areas established in 1967
1967 establishments in Japan